Richard Weaver may refer to:

Richard Weaver (MP) (1575–1642), English politician
Richard Weaver (American politician) (1827–1906), English-born Wisconsin politician
Richard Weaver (entomologist) (1783–1857), British entomologist
Richard C. Weaver, better known as the "Handshake Man"
Richard M. Weaver (1910–1963), American scholar